Hokovce is a village and municipality in the Levice District in the Nitra Region of Slovakia.

History
In historical records the village was first mentioned in 1245.

Geography
The village lies at an altitude of 138 metres and covers an area of 14.403 km². It has a population of about 575 people.

Ethnicity
The village is approximately 47% Magyar, 52% Slovak and 1% Gypsy.

Facilities
The village has a public library and a football pitch.

Genealogical resources

The records for genealogical research are available at the state archive "Statny Archiv in Banska Bystrica,  Nitra, Slovakia"

 Roman Catholic church records (births/marriages/deaths): 1784-1893 (parish A)
 Lutheran church records (births/marriages/deaths): 1721-1900 (parish B)

See also
 List of municipalities and towns in Slovakia

External links
https://web.archive.org/web/20080111223415/http://www.statistics.sk/mosmis/eng/run.html
 https://web.archive.org/web/20110430234623/http://www.hokovce.eu/index.html
Surnames of living people in Hokovce

Villages and municipalities in Levice District